The England women's national under-21 football team, also known as England women Under-21s or England women U21(s), was a youth association football team operated under the auspices of The Football Association. Its primary role is the development of players in preparation for the senior England women's national football team.

It was reinstated as an age group in 2018. Under the new system the team will help develop players after each U-20 World Cup. They will take part in the Nordic Cup previously contested by the then defunct U23s, and in non-World Cup years (bi-annually) will provide a World Cup-type programme to keep the flow and consistency of preparation for England seniors.

History

Beginnings
In February 1987 the Women's Football Association (WFA) appointed Liz Deighan to run a women's national under-21 team. Deighan had been a star midfielder in the England team which reached the 1984 European Competition for Women's Football. Four years later Deighan was not re–appointed and John Bilton took over. The team folded shortly afterwards because the WFA had run out of money. Eight of England's squad at the 1995 FIFA Women's World Cup had come through Deighan's U-21 team, including Pauline Cope, Karen Burke and Louise Waller.

FA sanctioned team
In summer 2004, The Football Association (FA) decided to reconstitute the U-21 team in order to give women a higher level of play to better prepare them for the full national team. Senior team manager Hope Powell held a four-day camp in Shropshire and announced: "This is a major step forward for our international teams and will bridge the gap between Under-19 and Senior levels. We have been observing players in this age bracket for the last six months and with the clubs' assistance I believe we can make this a real success." Powell installed her full-time assistant with the senior team, Brent Hills, as coach of the team, which remained an U-21 selection from 2004 through 2008.

Competing as an U-23 team
2008 saw the change of England's youth national women's team moved to the U-23 level. The move was made by the FA in response to age-level changes FIFA had made to its oldest women's youth competition, now named FIFA U-20 Women's World Cup. The age limit was raised from being a U-19 tournament to a U-20 tournament. This adjustment, coupled with a newly introduced U-23 age limit to the Nordic Cup, prompted the FA to rethink and eventually change the youth development team.

Return of U-21 team 
Following a review in September 2018, the FA announced the amalgamation of the U23s and U20s squads to reform an Under-21s age group, which would become the top tier of the nation's new professional development phase. The move would align England's structure to that used in other European countries to allow for more age-appropriate games and better manage individual player development post-U20 World Cup for those who have genuine senior team potential. The FA's head of women's development Kay Cossington and senior team manager Phil Neville stressed the move as an important part of the wider, long-term plan prior to the following summer's World Cup. The then U20s manager Mo Marley was announced as the team's first head coach.

Eligibility 
Although most national football teams represent a sovereign state, as a member of the United Kingdom's Home Nations, England is permitted by FIFA statutes to maintain its own national side that competes in all major tournaments.

Every player must meet FIFA eligibility rules. However, as long as they are eligible, players can play for England at any level, making it possible to play for the U21s, the senior side, and then again for the U21s provided they also meet the age restrictions. It is also possible to play for one country at youth level and another at senior level.

Current players
The following 19 players were named to the squad for a double-header of friendlies against  in March 2020.Head coach: Rehanne Skinner

Recent schedule and results

2019

2020

Coaches
  Mo Marley (2018–present)

References

Bibliography

 

Under-21
Youth football in England
European women's national under-21 association football teams
Women's national under-21 association football teams